Diego Armando Herner (born 31 July 1983, in Gualeguaychú in Entre Ríos) is a retired Argentine footballer, who played as a centre-back.

Herner started his career in 2001 with  Gimnasia LP, where he made over 100 appearances before moving to Banfield in July 2007.

External links
 Las Palmas official profile 
 Argentine Primera statistics at Fútbol XXI  
 

1983 births
Living people
Sportspeople from Entre Ríos Province
Argentine people of German descent
Argentine footballers
Argentine Primera División players
Categoría Primera B players
Categoría Primera A players
Paraguayan Primera División players
Segunda División players
Torneo Federal A players
Club de Gimnasia y Esgrima La Plata footballers
Club Atlético Banfield footballers
Club Atlético Huracán footballers
San Lorenzo de Almagro footballers
Cerro Porteño players
UD Las Palmas players
Independiente Medellín footballers
América de Cali footballers
Club Atlético Alvarado players
Guillermo Brown de Puerto Madryn footballers
Argentine expatriate footballers
Argentine expatriate sportspeople in Spain
Expatriate footballers in Paraguay
Expatriate footballers in Spain
Association football defenders